The Daniels House was a historic house at 902 East Central Street in Bentonville, Arkansas.  Built c. 1855, it was one of a small number of antebellum houses to survive in the city.  It was a single-story wood-frame structure with a side-gable roof and a Greek Revival tetrastyle portico projecting over its front entrance.  The columns supporting the portico were believed to be original, as was the narrow clapboard siding.

The house was listed on the National Register of Historic Places in 1988.  It burned down, and was subsequently delisted in 2018.

See also
National Register of Historic Places listings in Benton County, Arkansas

References

Houses on the National Register of Historic Places in Arkansas
Greek Revival houses in Arkansas
Houses completed in 1855
Houses in Bentonville, Arkansas
National Register of Historic Places in Bentonville, Arkansas
Demolished buildings and structures in Arkansas
Former National Register of Historic Places in Arkansas
1855 establishments in Arkansas
Burned houses in the United States